Umar 55 Ki Dil Bachpan Ka (translation: Age is 55 But Heart is Still Childish) a 1992 Bollywood crime-comedy-drama film, produced and directed by Ajay Mehra. The film features an ensemble cast of Kader Khan, Anupam Kher, Swapna Khanna, Gulshan Grover, Aruna Irani, Akshay Anand and Chandni Thakur.

Plot
Giving in to the demands of his children, namely: Govindram, Rohit, Aarti, and his daughter-in-law, Sunita, Dhaniram (Kader Khan) distributes his wealth between the four of them. Rohit prefers not to participate in this, and remains devoted to his dad. Greed overtakes Govind, Aarti and Govind's wife, and they become arrogant and ill-mannered. Even his daughter gets married without his consent to Shashi (Shashikiran). Dhaniram and his lawyer Batliwala (Anupam Kher) contact Dhaniram's twin brother Maniram, and together they get Dhaniram married to Priya (Swapna), who is much younger than Dhaniram. Thus the beneficiary of Dhaniram's estate is now changed to Priya, and it remains to be seen whether this will affect Dhaniram, Maniram, Govind, Rohit, Aarti, Snita, Shashim and others.

Cast
 Kader Khan as Maniram / Dhaniram
 Anupam Kher as Vakil Batliwala
 Gulshan Grover as Malhotra
 Aruna Irani as Rani
 Akshay Anand as Rohit
 Chandni Thakur as Aarti
 Ruchika Pandey as Sonia
 Dinesh Hingoo as Lakhpatiya
 Shakti Kapoor as Govindram
 Tiku Talsania as Avinash Chatterjee
 Shashikiran as Shashi
 Swapna Khanna as Priya

Music
"Jab Se Mila Hai Mujhe" - Anuradha Paudwal, Kumar Sanu
"Ye Dil Kaho To Dedu" - Alka Yagnik, Kumar Sanu
"Umar Pachpan Ki Dil Bachpan Ka" - Sudesh Bhosale, Sarika Kapoor, Aparna Mayekar
"Duniya Ko Chhod Ke, Rasmo Ko Tod Ke" - Amit Kumar, Alka Yagnik
"I Love You" - Alisha Chinai, Sudesh Bhosale
"Bombay Town" - Sudesh Bhosale, Jolly Mukherjee, Sarika Kapoor
"Jab Se Mila Hai Mujhe Pyar" (Sad) - Kumar Sanu

References

External links 
 

1992 films
1990s Hindi-language films
1990s crime comedy films
Films scored by Dilip Sen-Sameer Sen
1992 comedy films